This is a list of recipients of the A.T. Shousha Foundation Prize and Fellowship awarded by World Health Organization (WHO). 

In 1966, the 9th World Health Assembly established a foundation bearing Aly Tewfik Shousha (1891–1964) to honour the memory as one of the World Health Organization founders and first WHO Regional Director for the Eastern Mediterranean. The foundation's purpose is to award a prize known as the Shousha Prize, which is to be given to a person who made the most significant contribution to any health problem in the geographical area in which Dr Shousha served the WHO. The foundation also gives a Fellowship every 6 years that amounts to $15,000 USD.

List of recipients of the Shousha Prize

List of recipients of Shousha Fellowship

See also 

 List of Ihsan Doğramacı Family Health Foundation Prize laureates
 List of Léon Bernard Foundation Prize laureates
 List of Sasakawa Health Prize laureates
 List of United Arab Emirates Health Foundation Prize laureates
 List of Sheikh Sabah Al-Ahmad Al-Jaber Al-Sabah Prize laureates
 List of Dr LEE Jong-wook Memorial Prize for Public Health laureates
 List of The State of Kuwait Prize for the Control of Cancer, Cardiovascular Diseases and Diabetes in the Eastern Mediterranean Region laureates
 List of Jacques Parisot Foundation Fellowship laureates
 List of The Darling Foundation Prize laureates

References 

World Health Organization
Public health
Dr A.T. Shousha Foundation Prize and Fellowship laureates